Châu Thành can refer to any of these Vietnamese districts:
Châu Thành District, An Giang
Châu Thành District, Bến Tre
Châu Thành District, Đồng Tháp
Châu Thành District, Hậu Giang
Châu Thành District, Kiên Giang
Châu Thành District, Long An
Châu Thành District, Sóc Trăng
Châu Thành District, Tây Ninh
Châu Thành District, Tiền Giang
Châu Thành District, Trà Vinh